Simon of Ireland, of the late medieval era, was the author of a Latin poem "in seventeen lacklustre hexameters of a law case involving a parson's theft of an ox."  Simon is notable because very little Latin verse is known to have been written in late medieval Ireland.

References

Medieval Irish poets
Medieval Latin-language writers
Medieval Irish writers
Irish male poets